is a Japanese politician belonging to the Nikai Faction of the Liberal Democratic Party (LDP), serving his first term in the House of Councillors, representing Gumma Prefecture.

Early life
Shimizu is from the city of Takasaki in Gumma Prefecture. He graduated from the Tokyo University of Agriculture Second High School, located in Takasaki. He then attended Meiji Gakuin University in Tokyo. After graduating with a degree in economics, he worked in a number of social welfare service corporations, first as a trustee or councillor, then as a director, before beginning his political career.

Political career
In 2008, at the age of 28, he ran for office as a member of the Takasaki city council, serving 2 consecutive terms (2003–2011). He then was elected as a prefectural assembly member for 2 consecutive terms (2011–2019).

In the 25th regular election of members of the House of Councillors held on 21 July 2019, he defeated Atsuko Saito, a candidate of the Constitutional Democratic Party of Japan, and other opposition party candidates, to become a member of the House of Councillors. After winning the election, be joined the Nikai faction, a faction within the LDP led by Toshihiro Nikai.

Political views
 Favors amending the Constitution of Japan.
 Criticizes Abenomics.
 Favored the October 2019 increase in consumption tax to 10%.
 Has stated that the government's response to the problem of falsifying public documents relating to the Moritomo Gakuen scandals has been inadequate.

Affiliations
Shimizu is a member of the Conference to Japan's Dignity and National Interest (Nihon no Songen to Kokueki o Mamoru Kai).

References

Sources
This article is largely translated from the Japanese Wikipedia article.

External links
Official Website of Masato Shimizu

1975 births
Living people
People from Takasaki, Gunma
Meiji Gakuin University alumni
Members of the House of Councillors (Japan)
Tokyo University of Agriculture alumni